Darrell Lamont Jackson (born December 6, 1978) is an American former college and professional football player who was a wide receiver in the National Football League (NFL) for nine seasons during the 2000s.  Jackson played college football for the University of Florida, and thereafter, he played professionally for the Seattle Seahawks, the San Francisco 49ers and the Denver Broncos of the NFL.

Early years 

Jackson was born in Dayton, Ohio in 1978, one of eight brothers and sisters in his family.  He attended Tampa Catholic High School in Tampa, Florida, where he was a standout wide receiver for the Tampa Catholic Crusaders high school football team.  As a senior, Jackson set then-national high school records for career receiving yardage (4,594) and average yards per catch (24.05), and caught a total of 191 passes in three seasons for the Crusaders.  He had eighty-nine receptions for 2,087 yards and twenty-eight touchdowns as a junior, and sixty-seven receptions as a senior.

Basketball, not football, however, was Jackson's first love.  As the sophomore point guard of a basketball team that included only eight players, he led the Crusaders to the 3A crown and was named state tournament most valuable player.  As a senior, he led his team to the state tournament one more time in 1997, where it lost in the championship game.

The Tampa Tribune recognized Jackson as one of the 100 greatest Tampa Bay area athletes of the last century in 1999.  In 2007, eleven years after he graduated from Tampa Catholic, the Florida High School Athletic Association (FHSAA) recognized Jackson as one of the thirty-three all-time greatest Florida high school football players of the last 100 years by naming him to its "All-Century Team."

College career 

Jackson accepted an athletic scholarship to attend the University of Florida in Gainesville, Florida, where he was a wide receiver for coach Steve Spurrier's Florida Gators football team from 1997 to 1999.  He saw limited action as a freshman and sophomore, but he was the Gators' leading receiver in Spurrier's "fun 'n' gun" offense as a junior in 1999.  During the 1999 season, he had sixty-seven receptions for a total of 1,156 yards (an average of 17.3 yards per catch) and nine touchdowns, and had a memorable three-touchdown outing against the Alabama Crimson Tide.  Following his junior year, he was a first-team All-Southeastern Conference (SEC) selection and a third-team All-American.

Jackson decided to forgo his final year of college eligibility, and entered the NFL Draft after his junior season; he finished his college career with a total of 1,501 receiving yards.

Professional career

Seattle Seahawks 

During the  season, Jackson set a Seahawks franchise record with eighty-seven receptions (broken by Bobby Engram in 2007). On December 18, 2005, he made his first appearance for the Seahawks after returning from an injury that he received playing the Washington Redskins; in this appearance, he helped carry the Seahawks to victory with a touchdown reception.

In Super Bowl XL Jackson tied the record for most receptions made in the first quarter of a Super Bowl with five, tying former Buffalo Bills wide receiver Andre Reed.  Despite his brilliant performance, Seattle lost to the Pittsburgh Steelers 21–10.  He was denied a touchdown catch in the first quarter, due to a controversial offensive pass interference penalty called by back judge Bob Waggoner.

In Seahawks franchise history he is fifth in receiving yards, fourth in receiving touchdowns and sixth in receptions.

San Francisco 49ers 

On April 29, 2007, Jackson was traded to the San Francisco 49ers for a fourth-round draft pick in the 2007 NFL Draft.  On March 14, 2008, after a disappointing 2007 season, the San Francisco 49ers placed Jackson on waivers, making him a free agent.

Denver Broncos 

On April 16, 2008, Jackson signed a one-year, $1.5 million contract with the Denver Broncos. He filled in when called upon and started for the suspended Brandon Marshall in week 1, and the injured Eddie Royal in week 6.  Despite being third on the depth chart, he managed twelve receptions for 190 yards (a 16.5 yard average).

In his nine-season NFL career, Jackson played in 123 regular season games, started 107 of them, and had 499 receptions for 7,132 yards and fifty-one touchdowns.

NFL career statistics

Regular season

Postseason

See also 

 Florida Gators football, 1990–99
 List of Florida Gators in the NFL Draft
 List of Seattle Seahawks players

References

Bibliography 

 Carlson, Norm, University of Florida Football Vault: The History of the Florida Gators, Whitman Publishing, LLC, Atlanta, Georgia (2007).  .
 Golenbock, Peter, Go Gators!  An Oral History of Florida's Pursuit of Gridiron Glory, Legends Publishing, LLC, St. Petersburg, Florida (2002).  .
 Hairston, Jack, Tales from the Gator Swamp: A Collection of the Greatest Gator Stories Ever Told, Sports Publishing, LLC, Champaign, Illinois (2002).  .
 McCarthy, Kevin M.,  Fightin' Gators: A History of University of Florida Football, Arcadia Publishing, Mount Pleasant, South Carolina (2000).  .
 Nash, Noel, ed., The Gainesville Sun Presents The Greatest Moments in Florida Gators Football, Sports Publishing, Inc., Champaign, Illinois (1998).  .

External links 

 

1978 births
Living people
American football wide receivers
Denver Broncos players
Florida Gators football players
Players of American football from Dayton, Ohio
San Francisco 49ers players
Seattle Seahawks players
Players of American football from Tampa, Florida